Poustka is a municipality and village in Cheb District in the Karlovy Vary Region of the Czech Republic. It has about 200 inhabitants. It is known for the Seeberg Castle.

Administrative parts
The village of Ostroh is an administrative part of Poustka.

Geography
It lies in the Fichtel Mountains. The Slatinný Stream flows through the municipality.

History
The first written mention of Poustka is from 1275. Ostroh was first mentioned in 1322. The villages developed typically for the castle grounds, they provided the background for the castle. Farmers and people working at the castle lived here. It used to be a strategic point, but later the original function of the castle changed and it became mainly an administrative centre. Among the notable owners of the castle were the families of Schlick, Juncker, Zedtwitz and Nostitz.

Sights
The main landmark is the Seeberg Castle in Ostroh. It was built between 1250 and 1275. It originally served as a ministerial castle. The original Romanesque castle was later rebuilt in Gothic and Renaissance styles. It consists of a Romanesque and Gothic palace with a Renaissance wing. Today the castle is open to the public.

The Church of Saint Wolfgang was built in the Gothic style in 1470–1478. it was baroque rebuilt in 1721–1724.

References

External links

Villages in Cheb District